Milan Mijatović (Serbian Cyrillic: Милан Мијатовић, ; born 26 July 1987) is a Montenegrin professional footballer who plays as a goalkeeper for Al-Adalah and the Montenegro national team.

Career

Club career
He began his professional career at Rudar Pljevlja where he made his senior debut playing in the Montenegrin First League in the 2009–10 season. On the 18th of June 2019 he signed a 1+1 year contract with Bulgarian side Levski Sofia. He immediately established himself as the constant first choice goalkeeper. He kept 13 clean sheets for the team and made some amazing saves.  On 28 June 2020, he played the full 90 minutes in the 2:1 away win over Beroe in a First League game, which had been announced beforehand to be his last match for the "bluemen". After the game, Mijatović expressed his regret for leaving the club, noting that he wasn't offered a contract because of the financial uncertainty of the club. He also announced that he is to sign and play for MTK Budapest.

On 30 June 2022, Mijatović joined Saudi Arabian club Al-Adalah.

International career
On 12 October 2015, Mijatović made his senior international debut for Montenegro in a game against Russia.

Impaired vision

On 28th September 2015, Mijatović discovered that his vision was impaired, and was diagnosed with Myopia. As a result of this, it would have proved difficult for him to continue playing football at a high level, however, he has managed to carry on since, currently playing in the Saudi Arabian Pro League.

Career statistics

Club

Honours
 Rudar Pljevlja
 Montenegrin First League (1): 2009–10
 Montenegrin Cup (2): 2009–10, 2010–11

 Montenegro
UEFA Nations League: First Group 1 League C 2020–21

References

External links

 Profile at LevskiSofia.info

1987 births
Living people
Footballers from Podgorica
Association football goalkeepers
Montenegrin footballers
Montenegro international footballers
FK Rudar Pljevlja players
Sanat Mes Kerman F.C. players
Zob Ahan Esfahan F.C. players
FK Bokelj players
FK Dečić players
FK Budućnost Podgorica players
PFC Levski Sofia players
MTK Budapest FC players
Al-Adalah FC players
Montenegrin First League players
Persian Gulf Pro League players
First Professional Football League (Bulgaria) players
Nemzeti Bajnokság I players
Saudi Professional League players
Montenegrin expatriate footballers
Expatriate footballers in Iran
Montenegrin expatriate sportspeople in Iran
Expatriate footballers in Bulgaria
Montenegrin expatriate sportspeople in Bulgaria
Expatriate footballers in Hungary
Montenegrin expatriate sportspeople in Saudi Arabia